Shangying may refer to the following locations in China:

 Shangying, Lufeng, Guangdong (上英镇), town
 Shangying, Shulan (上营镇), town in Jilin
 Shangying Township, Tiandeng County (上映乡), Guangxi
 Shangying Township, Qianxi County, Hebei (上营乡)